The Council of Wise Men of the plain of Murcia is a customary court which is responsible for resolving irrigation conflicts in the plain of Murcia.

In 2009 it was chosen along with the Water Tribunal of the plain of Valencia as an intangible cultural heritage by UNESCO.

Council function
The judgments of the Council of Wise Men are oral, being a scribe recover usual statements. The panel is chaired by the Mayor or his delegate. He has a decisive vote in case of a tie and is responsible for carrying out the resolutions. He also has the authority to fine members who do not attend the meetings. The Council of Wise Men comprise five fulls members and five attorneys. Its aim is to rule on and resolve issues and demands for certain offenses in the ordinances of the plains.

The Council holds its hearings in public every Thursday in the salon of the city hall of Murcia, from nine until midnight.

References

External links 
 Official Website. 
 UNESCO Website. Description.

Region of Murcia
Intangible Cultural Heritage of Humanity
Agricultural organisations based in Spain
Irrigation in Spain